The CenturyLink Operating Companies are local exchange carriers owned by CenturyLink, the third largest landline telephone company in the United States. 

CenturyLink operating companies consist of operations inherited from various predecessor companies, which is reflected in the differing names of the companies and partially overlapping service territories; all operating companies do business as CenturyLink. Predecessors include: 
 CenturyTel - the former corporate name of CenturyLink.
 Embarq, the former landline operations of Sprint Nextel, which were spun off in 2006; these include operations dating from Sprint's time as United Telecommunications and operations owned by Centel, which it acquired in 1993.
 Qwest Communications International - which, through its acquisition of U S WEST, inherited operations of the former Bell System in numerous western states.

List

CenturyTel companies
CenturyLink grew as Century Telephone and later CenturyTel through acquiring many small and mid-size telephone companies. These include:
CenturyTel of Adamsville, Inc. d/b/a CenturyLink Adamsville (Mississippi, Tennessee)
CenturyTel of Alabama, LLC - formerly part of Contel of the South and Verizon South
CenturyTel of Arkansas, Inc.
CenturyTel of Central Arkansas, LLC - formerly GTE
CenturyTel of Chester, Inc. (Iowa, Minnesota)
CenturyTel of Claiborne, Inc. d/b/a CenturyLink Claiborne (Tennessee)
CenturyTel of Colorado, Inc. - formerly Universal Telephone
CenturyTel of Eagle, Inc. (Colorado) - portions formerly part of  U S WEST Communications
CenturyTel of Missouri, LLC - formerly part of GTE Midwest
CenturyTel of Mountain Home, Inc. (Arkansas)
CenturyTel of the Northwest, Inc. (Montana, Oregon, Washington) - formerly Pacific Telecom, portions formerly part of U S WEST Communications
CenturyTel of Northwest Arkansas, LLC - formerly part GTE Southwest
CenturyTel of Ooltewah-Collegedale, Inc. d/b/a CenturyLink Ooltewah (Tennessee)
CenturyTel of Ohio, Inc. - formerly owned by Centel
CenturyTel of Port Aransas, Inc. (Texas)
CenturyTel of Redfield, Inc. (Arkansas)
CenturyTel of San Marcos, Inc. (Texas)
CenturyTel of South Arkansas, Inc.
CenturyTel of the Gem State, Inc. (Idaho, Nevada) - formerly owned by Pacific Telecom
CenturyTel of the Midwest-Kendall, LLC - portions formerly part of Wisconsin Bell
CenturyTel of the Southwest, Inc.  - five rate centers in New Mexico
Spectra Communications Group, LLC (Missouri) - formerly part of GTE Midwest
Telephone USA of Wisconsin, LLC - 89% owned

Former Embarq companies
The following companies were formerly owned by Embarq, acquired in 2009, and formerly owned by Sprint Nextel until 2006. Centel companies are also included, which was purchased by Sprint in 1993.
Carolina Telephone and Telegraph Company (North Carolina)
Central Telephone Company (Nevada, North Carolina)
Central Telephone Company of Virginia, Inc.
Central Telephone Company of Texas
Embarq Florida, Inc.
Embarq Minnesota, Inc.
Embarq Missouri, Inc.
United Telephone Company of Eastern Kansas
United Telephone Company of Kansas
United Telephone Company of Ohio
United Telephone Company of Indiana
United Telephone Company of New Jersey
United Telephone Company of Pennsylvania, covering South Central Pennsylvania and the area in and around Butler County, Pennsylvania
United Telephone Company of South Carolina
United Telephone Company of South Central Kansas
United Telephone - Southeast, Inc. (Virginia & Tennessee)
United Telephone Company of the West - (Nebraska &Wyoming)
United Telephone Company of Texas
United Telephone of the Northwest - (Oregon & Washington)

Former Qwest companies
Qwest, which was acquired in 2011, owned an original Bell Operating Company and a small independent provider. Qwest acquired U S WEST, one of the Baby Bells, in 2000.
El Paso County Telephone Company (El Paso County, Colorado)
Qwest Corporation (Arizona, Colorado, Idaho, Iowa, Minnesota, Montana, Nebraska, New Mexico, North Dakota, Oregon, South Dakota, Texas, Utah, Washington, Wyoming)

References 

Lumen Technologies